Louis "Sabu" Martinez (July 14, 1930 – January 13, 1979) was an American conguero of Puerto Rican descent. A prominent player in the Cubop movement, Martinez appeared on many important recordings and live performances during that period. Martinez also recorded several Latin jazz albums, now recognized as classics of the genre.

Born in New York City, Martinez made his professional debut in 1941 aged 11. He replaced Chano Pozo in Dizzy Gillespie's orchestra in 1948, and began performing with Benny Goodman's Bebop Orchestra in 1949. Over the next 15 years, Martinez worked with Charlie Parker, Duke Ellington, Count Basie, J. J. Johnson, Horace Silver, Thelonious Monk, Charles Mingus, Mary Lou Williams, Lionel Hampton, Noro Morales, Marcelino Guerra, Esy Morales, the Lecuona Cuban Boys, Miguelito Valdés, Tito Rodríguez, and the Joe Loco Trio. He also worked with vocalists Tony Bennett, Sammy Davis, Jr., and Harry Belafonte.

Martinez first recorded with Art Blakey in 1953, and contributed to his Orgy in Rhythm and Holiday for Skins projects from 1957 to 1958. Martinez became a bandleader in 1957, recording his debut album, Palo Congo, for the Blue Note label. He followed it up with releases on Vik and Alegre Records. Martinez moved to Sweden in 1967 and recorded with the  Francy Boland-Kenny Clarke big band, releasing two albums. Subsequently, he led the group Burnt Sugar, which was active into the mid 1970s. On January 13, 1979, he died in Sweden at the age of 48 from a gastric ulcer.

Discography

As leader/Co-leader
 Palo Congo (Blue Note, 1957)
 Safari With Sabu (Vik, 1958)
 Sabu And His Percussion Ensemble, Sorcery! (Columbia, 1958)
 Sabu's Jazz Espagnole (Alegre, 1961)
 Sabu Martinez Och Björbobandet, Aurora Borealis (Coop, 1971)
 Afro Temple (Grammofonverket, 1973)
 Burned Sugar (Mellotronen, 2008) - recorded in 1973 and 1974
 Sabu Martinez and Sahib Shihab, Winds & Skins (Mellotronen, 2008) - recorded in 1967 and 1978

As contributor
Dizzy Gillespie - The Complete RCA Victor Recordings (Bluebird, 1937-1949, [1995])

Horace Silver, Art Blakey - Horace Silver Trio and Art Blakey-Sabu (Blue Note Records, 1953)

Louis Bellson - The Driving Louis Bellson (Norgran, 1955)
Art Blakey - Drum Suite (Columbia, 1957)
Art Blakey - Orgy in Rhythm (Blue Note, 1957)
Art Blakey - Cu-Bop (Jubilee, 1957)
Art Blakey - Holiday for Skins (Blue Note, 1959)

Kenny Clarke/Francy Boland Big Band: Latin Kaleidoscope (MPS, 1969)

References

External links
 all about jazz article
 discogs article
 Sabu Martinez Memorial

1930 births
1979 deaths
Jazz percussionists
Latin jazz percussionists
Afro-Cuban jazz percussionists
Blue Note Records artists
Conga players
20th-century drummers